Calamagrostis eminens is a grass species in the genus Calamagrostis. It is found in South America.

References

elegans
Plants described in 1830